{{Speciesbox
| image = DrombHaleiWhitley.jpg
| image_caption = llustration of the holotype of Hale's Drombus, Drombus halei 
| status = LC
| status_system = IUCN3.1
| status_ref = 
| taxon = Drombus halei
| authority = Whitley, 1935<ref name = CoF>{{Cof record|spid=43477|title=Dromus halei|access-date=25 August 2018}}</ref>
}}Drombus halei'', Hale's drombus, is a species of ray-finned fish from the family Gobiidae. It is found in the warmer waters of Australia from 
Shark Bay, Western Australia, to Shoalwater Bay, Queensland. where it occurs around shallow inshore rocky and coral-rock reefs, where there are areas which have sea beds consisting of sand, rubble and sandy-mud, it can also sometimes be found in estuaries and near mangroves. The specific name honours Herbert M. Hale (1895-1963) who was Director of the South Australian Museum.

References

halei
Marine fish of Northern Australia
Fish described in 1935